Donald Heddaeus Smith (October 18, 1910 – January 27, 1994) was an American college basketball player who played for the University of Pittsburgh during the 1930s. He was voted as a consensus NCAA All-American as a senior in 1932–33 after guiding the Panthers to their second consecutive Eastern Intercollegiate Conference championship. Smith, who was from Bellevue, Pennsylvania, was known for his quick basketball instincts. After retirement, he became a dentist in the Pittsburgh area.

References

External links
NBL stats

1910 births
1994 deaths
Akron Firestone Non-Skids players
All-American college men's basketball players
American men's basketball players
Basketball players from Pennsylvania
Guards (basketball)
People from Allegheny County, Pennsylvania
Pittsburgh Panthers men's basketball players
Pittsburgh Pirates (NBL) players
Sportspeople from the Pittsburgh metropolitan area